Ronin Arts is a role-playing game company founded as a join venture by Philip J. Reed and Christopher Shy in 2003, to some degree a successor to Shy's Studio Ronin and Reed's selling of role playing games PDFs from his blog.

Ronin Arts publishes or published at some point, among other products The Whispering Vault, Star Ace, M&M Superlink support, and D20 Future support.

History
In 2003, author Philip J. Reed and artist Christopher Shy joined forces to create Ronin Arts as a new company to highlight their talents. The first version of the web site sold both Reed's 101 books along with illustrated art books like Shy's edition of H. P. Lovecraft's Herbert West: Reanimator (2003). That same year, Ronin Arts expanded beyond their d20 collections by purchasing Pariah Press' The Whispering Vault and Pacesetter's Star Ace. They started producing new Whispering Vault material almost immediately, beginning with Ronin Publishing's previously unpublished Mortal Magic (2003), but after several more PDFs in 2003, that line ceased. Reed had intended to convert Star Ace to d20 Modern but never completed the task. Ronin Arts was doing so well that in 2004 Reed left his day job at Steve Jackson Games to work on the company full-time. Around the same time, new freelancers such as Bruce Baugh, Michael Hammes, James Maliszewski and Patrick Younts began writing for Ronin Arts. 

Ronin Arts has produced material for other licensed systems, publishing the "Runic Fantasy" series for Mongoose Publishing's RuneQuest (2006-2007), the "First Edition Fantasy" series for AD&D retroclone OSRIC (2006-2007), and supplements for Mutants & Masterminds (2003-2008). Hammes and Reed wrote 4C System (2007), the retroclone to TSR's Marvel Super Heroes system, which then attracted supplements by Hazard Studio, Highmoon Games, Seraphim Guard and others. Ronin Arts also published one of the few early Freeport licenses, Treasures of Freeport (2004) and thereafter produced a handful of True20 supplements (2005-2006) and a long series of Mutants & Masterminds Archetype books (2006-2007) which were sold directly by Green Ronin. In 2006 Reed was able to successfully sell an extended series of PDFs called ePublishing 101, which recounted how to make PDF production work. By 2007, the PDF market had cooled considerably and Reed decided to go back to work at Steve Jackson Games, and in 2008 he became Chief Operating Officer of the company.

Ronin Arts began as an experiment, when Reed wrote the company's first PDF 101 Spellbooks.  Surprised by how quickly the gaming community embraced the product, he quickly set out to produce more. The company soon made its products available at RPGNOW.com, one of the first sites to exclusively handle the sale and promotion of roleplaying games in electronic format. From 2003 to 2007 at least, Ronin Arts was considered one of the most successful publishers in the emerging PDF industry.

In February 2007, however, they ended their relationship with RPGNOW due to creative differences.

As of March 2015, Ronin Arts' website is no longer active, having apparently been let go as of late 2012 or early 2013. Many of its products are still available by way of Lulu, Warehouse 23 and Paizo Publishing.

Not to be confused with Green Ronin Publishing, another popular producer of RPG supplements.

References

Companies established in 2003
Role-playing game publishing companies